Mister Philippines 2012 is a male pageant in the Philippines. Mister Philippines 2012 will represent the Philippines in Thailand for the Mister International 2012. Finals is on October 6, 2012 Saturday at the Crossroads77 along Mother Ignacia St., Quezon City, Philippines.

Official Candidates
After the last screening on August 25, 2012, a press presentation was done for the official candidates vying for the title last September 16, 2012.

See also
 Manhunt International
 Mister World

External links
 Mister Philippines website

Mister International